Reluctant Bride (released in the U.S. as Two Grooms for a Bride) is a 1955 British comedy film.

Plot summary
Jeff Longstreet and Laura Weeks are paired together to take care of a group of wild children whose parents are lost on an African safari. The children make attempts to press Jeff and Laura into a romantic relationship while breaking them away from their fiancees.

Partial cast
John Carroll as Jeff Longstreet
Virginia Bruce as Laura Weeks
Brian Oulton as Professor Baker
Kay Callard as Lola Sinclair
Donald Stewart as Cadwell
Arthur Lowe as Mr. Fogarty

Critical reception
The Radio Times called it a "Far-fetched comedy" and rated it two out of five stars; while Sky Cinema wrote "Hollywood stars Virginia Bruce and John Carroll help to give a top coating of sophistication to this feather-light British comedy."

References

External links

1955 films
1955 comedy films
British comedy films
Films directed by Henry Cass
1950s English-language films
1950s British films
British black-and-white films